The Tanchangya script, also known as  Ka-Pat,  is an abugida used to write the Tanchangya language. It is in the southern Brahmic family of scripts. Due to its script family, it has similarities to the Burmese alphabet, Mon alphabet, and Chakma script.

Origin
The script seem to be derived from ancient Brahmic scripts, which inherited the vowel sound within the consonants. If not an independent derivation, it should have derived from Burmese or Mon due to their dwelling with Mon and Burmese from 9th Century B.C (in Tagong the ancient civilisation of Burma  to until the 15th century Common Era (during the 15th Century, they were attacked by the Rakhine king and brought them to Arakan in 15th Century from Micchagiri, present Thaye in Magwe Division to Arakan) (Dhanyawady Aye Daw Bung, 4). It is believed that they had used the Brahmic scripts in the earlier stages, who were known by the term Thek or Sakya in northern Myanmar.

The Tanchangya script were introduced recently in 2012 by adopting a manuscript in Rakhine State as stated by Rupak Debnath.
Though both Chakma and Tanchangya have been using the present Chakma script for a long time, it is still unconfirmed who the alphabets originally belonged to and who introduced it. John M. Clifton in his ‘’Dialects, Orthography and Society ‘’opined that ‘the Tanchangya community decided to base their alphabet on the Chakma  to show they were related to the Chakma. However, they systematically changed the alphabet to show that they were different from the Chakma they were not simply a part of the larger Chakma community.’  Moreover, in order not to cause misunderstanding between two communities, Tanchangya has introduced these alphabets which are yet to develop into Unicode font. For the time being, it is just created as True Font.

Characteristics

It is written from left to right, similarly to Brahmi scripts, unlike the Kharosti, which were used to write from right to left.

Vowels
There are five independent vowels such as A (a:), I(i), v(ʊ), E(e), and O a(oʊ). The other  five vowels are dependent namely, Aa(ɔ), AA(ʌ), Ii(i:), and  Uu(u:).

Consonants
There are thirty-one consonants letter found in Tanchangya script. They are classified into group consonants and miscellaneous consonants.

Notes

References
 
 

Alphabets
Brahmic scripts